Henri II de Bourbon, Prince of Condé (1 September 1588 – 26 December 1646) was the head of the senior-most cadet branch of the House of Bourbon for nearly all his life and heir presumptive to the King of France for the first few years of his life. Henri was the father of Louis, le Grand Condé, the celebrated French general.

Life
Henri was born in 1588, the third child and only son of Henri I, Prince of Condé and Charlotte Catherine de La Trémoille, daughter of Louis III de La Trémoille, Duke of Thouars. His mother was in prison at Saint-Jean-d'Angély at the time, accused of killing her husband.  He had two older sisters, namely Catherine de Bourbon, his paternal half-sister who died unwed in 1595, and Éléonore de Bourbon, who in 1606 was married, aged 19, to 51-year-old Philip William, Prince of Orange.

Henri was a posthumous child, his father having died nearly six months before his birth. He therefore became Prince of Condé within weeks of his birth, as soon as he was recognized and confirmed by the King of France.

King Henry III of France died in August 1589, when Henri was less than one year old, and was succeeded by Henry IV of France, who was the first cousin of Henri's late father, and Henri's godfather. Less than a year later, the new King's uncle (Henri's great uncle) and initial heir, Cardinal Charles died. At this point, Henri, being the King's closest agnatic kin, became First Prince of the blood and heir presumptive to the throne of France, and remained so for twelve years, until the birth of the future Louis XIII of France in September 1601. Henri was raised as a Catholic at the insistence of Pope Clement VIII. Henri's father and grandfather had been leaders of the Calvinist Huguenots.  Henri's mother was in prison for six years, accused of poisoning her husband; she was later released.

From 1612 to 1616 he was Lieutenant General of New France.

Later, during the years 1611–38, Henri was second-in-line to the throne of France, behind Gaston, Duke of Orleans. This was the period between the death of Nicolas Henri, Duke of Orleans in November 1611 and the birth of the future Louis XIV of France in September 1638.

Marriage and issue

In 1609, Henri married Charlotte Marguerite de Montmorency, daughter of Henri I de Montmorency, Duke of Montmorency by his second wife, Louise de Budos. In 1610, Marie de Médici, wife of King Henry IV, gave the Hôtel de Condé in Paris to Henri as part of a recompense for his agreeing to marry Charlotte. From then on, the Hôtel de Condé became the main residence of the Princes of Condé until 1764. Henri and Charlotte were blessed with three children, all of them protagonists of the Fronde, namely:

 Anne Geneviève de Bourbon (1619–1679), married Henri II d'Orléans, Duke of Longueville.
 Louis de Bourbon, Prince of Condé (1621–1686), the celebrated French general known as le Grand Condé. The Princes of Conde male line became extinct in 1830 with the death of Louis Henri II, Prince of Conde.
Armand de Bourbon, Prince of Conti (1629–1666), married Anne Marie Martinozzi, daughter of Girolamo Martinozzi. 

Reportedly, King Henry IV fancied Charlotte himself, and arranged the marriage with Condé in order to provide cover for an affair. However, Condé would have none of it, and escaped with his wife first to Brussels and later to Milan, both of which were under the rule of the House of Habsburg. The Condé affair became part of the international conflict known as the War of the Jülich Succession (one of the precursors to the Thirty Years' War).

Ancestors

References

Sources

1588 births
1646 deaths
Dukes of Montmorency
Henri
Grand Masters of France
Henri
Henri
16th-century French nobility
Grand Huntsmen of France
Heirs presumptive to the French throne
Ancien Régime office-holders
Henri
17th-century peers of France
Prisoners of the Bastille